Parḷḷeiru is one of 6 parishes in the municipality of Villayón, in  Asturias, Spain.

Geography

Parḷḷeiru is a Parroquia with 201 inhabitants (2007) and an Area of 20.68 km². Its altitude is 728m.  It is 10 km away from the municipal capital Villayón.

Rivers and lakes
The rivers Parḷḷeiru and el Bauloso join with the Río Bullimeiro and then with the  Río Cabornel, entering the Río Navia.

Transport
Nearest airport: Oviedo

Economy
Agriculture has dominated the region for hundreds of years.

Climate
Warm summers and mild, occasionally harsh Winters. In Autumn there may be strong storms.

Points of interest
  The Church of San Bartolomé

Smaller villages in the parish
 Buḷḷimeiru 12 inhabitants (2007)
 Las Berrugas 5 inhabitants (2007) 
 La Candanosa 11 inhabitants (2007)
 Los Ḷḷagos 15 inhabitants (2007) 
 Las Cárcobas 19 inhabitants (2007) 
 Ḷḷandelfornu 35 inhabitants (2007) 
 Llandequintá 60 inhabitants (2007) 
 L'Azoreirina 8 inhabitants (2007) 
 Valvona 7 inhabitants (2007) 
 Parḷḷeiru 29 inhabitants (2007)

References

External links
 Citypage
  Asturian Map

Parishes in Villayón
Towns in Asturias